Need You Now is the second studio album by American country music trio Lady Antebellum. It was released on January 26, 2010 through Capitol Nashville. It is the follow-up album to their 2008 self-titled debut album. The production on the album was handled by Paul Worley and Lady Antebellum.

Need You Now received generally positive reviews from music critics and was also a massive commercial success. The album debuted at number one on the US Billboard 200, selling 481,000 copies sold in its first week. It was eventually certified quadruple platinum by the Recording Industry Association of America (RIAA) in March 2013. On February 13, 2011, the album won the Best Country Album and was nominated for Album of the Year, whereas the single "Need You Now" won four awards, including Song of the Year and Record of the Year at the 53rd Annual Grammy Awards.

Singles
"Need You Now", the first single, debuted at number 50 on the U.S. Billboard Hot Country Songs chart in August 2009. For the week of November 28, it became their second number one single on the Hot Country Songs chart in the United States, as issued by Billboard. After the trio's performance of the song at the Country Music Association Awards, it climbed to a number five peak on the Billboard Hot 100, experiencing a surge in sales after the 52nd Annual Grammy Awards, peaking at number two, their highest peaking single on the Hot 100 and pop charts. As of January 5, 2013, it has been certified 6× Platinum by the RIAA.
The song was used in the first episode of the TV show Hellcats.

"American Honey", the second single, debuted at number 47 on the Hot Country Songs chart for the week of January 2, 2010, before its initial release date of January 11, 2010. In April 2010, the song became their third consecutive number one single, as well as third top 30 single on the Billboard Hot 100.

In the United Kingdom and Europe (except from Germany), "I Run to You" was the second single taken from the International Edition of the album. It was released on 9 August 2010 in support of their debut UK live show at Shepherd's Bush Empire.

"Our Kind of Love" was confirmed as the third single off the album. The song was released as a promotional single on January 10, 2010, and received its official release as the set's third single in late May.

"Hello World", the album's fourth single, was released to radio on October 4, 2010.

Critical reception

Upon its release, Need You Now received generally mixed reviews from music critics. At Metacritic, which assigns a normalized rating out of 100 to reviews from mainstream critics, the album received an average score of 63, based on 9 reviews, which indicates "generally favorable reviews".

Giving it four stars out of five, Jessica Phillips wrote in Country Weekly magazine that the group "certainly need have no fear of a sophomore slump" due to the success of "Need You Now". She also said that the album showed the trio's "ability to craft memorable country pop hooks," but added that "not every song works on this record." Crystal Bell, writing for Billboard was also positive in her review citing Kelley's vocal slyness and the delicate arrangement of the track, "Ready to Love Again", also noting "the trio's musical growth."

Allmusic reviewer Thom Jurek wrote that on this album "they stick very close to the formula of their debut: a slew of mid- and uptempo love songs, a sad ballad, and a couple of rocked-up good-time tunes — all self-written with some help from some of Nashville's most respected writers." He also went on to say that the album was "flawless in its songwriting, production, and performances." Mikael Wood of Entertainment Weekly said, "they're most successful when they keep to the moody minor key stuff" and gave the album a B+. Jonathan Keefe of Slant Magazine was less positive.

Allegations that the title song stole from The Alan Parsons Project's song 'Eye in the Sky' have been widespread online, and representatives for Parsons commented.

Commercial performance
Need You Now debuted at number one on the US Billboard 200 chart, selling 481,000 copies in its first week. This became Lady Antebellum's first US number one debut. In its second week, the album remained at number one on the chart, selling an additional 209,000 copies. 

In its third week, the album dropped to number two on the chart, selling 208,000 more copies. In its fourth week, the album remained at number two on the chart, selling 144,000 copies. 

In 2010, the album became the third best-selling album of the year, behind I Dreamed a Dream by Susan Boyle and Recovery by American rapper Eminem. The album also spent 31 non-consecutive weeks at number one on the Top Country Albums chart in 2010 and 2011. On March 20, 2013, the album was certified quadruple platinum by the Recording Industry Association of America (RIAA) for sales of over four million copies in the United States.

After the 53rd Annual Grammy Awards and the band winning five awards, Need You Now debuted at number 24 on the German Albums Chart in February 2011, 9 months after the release of the album.

Usage in other media
The song "Perfect Day" has been used in one of The CW's commercials to promote new TV series Hart of Dixie.

Track listing

Bonus download songs
Each month on ladyantebellum.com, a new song became available to all who bought a CD, digital download, or passcode version of the album.
"Need You Now" (Acoustic) (Haywood, Kear, Kelley, Scott) — 
"I Run to You" (Acoustic) (Haywood, Kelley, Scott, Douglas) — 
"American Honey" (Live) (Barlowe, Lindsey, Stevens) — 
"Our Kind of Love" (Live) (Haywood, Kelley, Scott, Busbee) — 
"Stars Tonight" (Live) (Powell, Haywood, Kelley, Scott)  — 
"All We'd Ever Need" (Live) (Haywood, Kelley, Scott) — 
"Do I" (Live) (Luke Bryan, Kelley, Haywood) — 
"When You Got a Good Thing" (Live) (Haywood, Kelly, Rutherford, Scott) — 
"Slow Down Sister" (Live) (Haywood, Kelly, Gambill, Shaw) — 
"Love's Lookin' Good On You" (Live) (Deere, Lopez, Shaw) — 
"Hello World" (Live) (Douglas, Lane, Lee) —

Personnel

Lady Antebellum
 Dave Haywood – acoustic guitar, electric guitar, piano, mandolin, background vocals
 Charles Kelley – lead vocals, background vocals
 Hillary Scott – lead vocals, background vocals

Additional musicians
Bruce Bouton – dobro
busbee – piano
Chad Cromwell – drums
Stuart Duncan – fiddle, mandolin
Jason "Slim" Gambill – electric guitar, soloist
David Huff – loop programming, percussion, tambourine
Rob McNelley – electric guitar, soloist
The Nashville String Machine – strings
Mike Rojas – accordion, Hammond B-3 organ, piano, synthesizer
Kris Wilkinson – string arrangements
Paul Worley – acoustic guitar, electric guitar, soloist
Craig Young – bass guitar

Charts

Weekly charts

Year-end charts

Decade-end charts

Singles

Certifications

Release history

References

2010 albums
Albums produced by Paul Worley
Capitol Records Nashville albums
Lady A albums
Grammy Award for Best Country Album